Desperate Housewives: The Game is a life simulation adventure game developed by Liquid Entertainment and released by Buena Vista Games in 2006, in the style of The Sims games. It is based on the television series Desperate Housewives. The player takes the part of a housewife with amnesia who has recently moved with her husband and son to Wisteria Lane. The plot takes place over 12 episodes. The game features a script by Desperate Housewives writer Scott Sanford Tobis and voice acting by Brenda Strong. It achieved sales in excess of 400,000 copies by early 2009.

Plot 
The game begins when a family moves to Wisteria Lane: a successful doctor working at the Fairview Medical Center, a wife with a forgotten past after a jogging accident and their son. Edie Britt first introduces the wife to Wisteria Lane and visits Bree Van de Kamp, who invites her to gossip at her house along with Susan Mayer, Lynette Scavo and Gabrielle Solis. A pair of brothers then visit the player's house: Daniel Fox, a famous designer and his twin brother Frank Fox, who installs an Internet service in the player's computer. The player's character then progresses through episodes, completing tasks that range from gardening and cooking for player's family, to discovering the secrets of the neighborhood.

The doctor's wife must battle off a love rival to her husband – his secretary Jackie Marlen who stops at no cost to get what she wants – and the cranky neighbor, Etta Davenport. Not only this but she must deal with the antics of her unruly 14-year-old son and the people around him. Other residents aren't as nice as they seem when a private investigator, Erik Larsen, shows up in town alongside a shady businessman, Vincent Corsetty, who seems to have ulterior motives. In the end, their secrets are aired to the public and a desperate decision is made in a hostage situation.

Endings
Desperate Housewives: The Game has four different endings:

The main character shoots everyone. But who got shot in the real "Game?"
The main character lives happily ever after with the husband.
The main character lives happily ever after with Erik Larsen.
The main character runs off with Vincent Corsetty.

Reception

Desperate Housewives received "mixed" reviews according to the review aggregation website Metacritic. Some reviewers praised it as a well-written and faithful adaption of the television series; however, the game also attracted criticism for its derivative, simplistic gameplay and prominent product placement. The editors of PC Gamer US presented Desperate Housewives with their 2006 "Best Adventure Game" award.

In the United States, Desperate Housewives: The Game debuted at #6 on the NPD Group's weekly computer game sales chart for the October 8–14 period. Tor Thorsen of GameSpot reported that the game "instantly became the subject of widespread derision" upon its announcement, but that its first-week placement suggested its "publisher may be having the last laugh". Desperate Housewives ultimately achieved sales in excess of 400,000 copies by January 2009.

References

External links
Desperate Housewives: The Game at Buena Vista Games website
 

2006 video games
Game
Disney video games
Liquid Entertainment games
Single-player video games
Social simulation video games
Video games based on television series
Video games developed in the United States
Video games featuring female protagonists
Video games set in the 2000s
Video games set in the United States
Windows games
Windows-only games
Video games with alternate endings
Video games with customizable avatars